British Airways Flight 268 was a regularly scheduled flight from Los Angeles to London Heathrow. On February 20, 2005, the innermost left engine burst into flames triggered by an engine compressor stall almost immediately after take off from LAX. The 747-400 continued to fly across the United States, Canada, and the Atlantic Ocean with its three remaining engines despite air traffic controllers expecting the pilots to perform the emergency landing at the airport. The flight then made an emergency landing at Manchester Airport, citing insufficient usable fuel to reach London Heathrow.

Flight incident 
The flight took off at about 9:24 p.m. on 20 February 2005. When the aircraft, a four-engine Boeing 747-436, was around  into the air, flames burst out of its number 2 engine, a result of engine surge. The pilots shut the engine down. Air traffic control expected the plane to return to the airport and deleted its flight plan. However, after consulting with the airline dispatcher, the pilots decided to set off on their flight plan "and get as far as we can" rather than dump 70 tonnes of fuel and land. The 747 is certified to fly on three engines. Having reached the East Coast, the assessment was that the plane could continue safely. The cross-Atlantic journey encountered less favourable conditions than predicted. Upon reaching the UK, believing there to be insufficient usable fuel to reach their destination, the captain declared an emergency and landed at Manchester Airport.

Controversy 
A safety controversy ensued; the US Federal Aviation Administration (FAA) accused the carrier of flying an "unairworthy" plane across the Atlantic Ocean. The FAA proposed fining the carrier, British Airways (BA) $25,000. BA lodged an appeal on the grounds that they were flying according to United Kingdom Civil Aviation Authority (CAA) rules (which are derived from International Civil Aviation Organization standards). In the end, the FAA told BA it was dropping the case based on assurances that airline changes will "preclude the type of extended operation that was the subject of this enforcement action." BA said they had not changed their procedures and according to Flight International the FAA said that they "will recognise the CAA's determination that the aircraft was not unairworthy".

Investigation 
The investigation report recommended that BA revise its training of crews in three-engine operation fuel management procedures.

During the investigation, the British Air Accidents Investigation Branch discovered that one of the eight tracks on the Flight Data Recording tape had been erased during flight as a result of a short circuit in the unit, resulting in the loss of over three hours of data. It recommended that the FAA should require Honeywell, the manufacturer of the flight data recorder, to include a visual inspection of the printed circuit board during routine maintenance of the FDR.

Aftermath 
The plane involved in the incident, registered as G-BNLG, was eventually repaired and remained in service until December 2014.

British Airways still uses the flight number 268 for flights from Los Angeles to London. The Boeing 747-400s continued to fly the route until the Airbus A380s later replaced them in 2013.

References

External links 
  ABC News Report
 Official AAIB report

Aviation accidents and incidents in the United States in 2005
Accidents and incidents involving the Boeing 747
268
Airliner accidents and incidents caused by in-flight fires
Aviation accidents and incidents in England
Airliner accidents and incidents in California
2005 in California
2005 in England
February 2005 events in Europe